Lavinia-Corina Cosma (born 30 October 1981) is the co-president of the Green Party (Greens), former Romanian deputy, elected in 2016.

Politics 
In 2020, she ran for the Târgu Mureș mayor, which she lost, obtaining 505 votes.

The former Mures deputy Lavinia Cosma was elected on Saturday, September 3, as co-president of the Green Party, on the occasion of the Extraordinary Congress that took place in Bucharest. According to the Press Office of the Green Party, during the Extraordinary Congress, the motion "Just Romania. A Healthy Country!", which is based "on the construction of a healthy Romania.

References 

Living people
1981 births
Romanian women in politics
Members of the Chamber of Deputies (Romania)